La Fórmula is a reggaeton super-group, consisting of artists Zion & Lennox, RKM & Ken-Y, Plan B, Arcángel, Lobo & Jalil Lopez. They are currently signed to Pina Records.

History

2010-: Start & Debut Album 
The group formed in 2010 after Pina Records owner Raphy Piña announced that Pina Records would release a compilation album featuring artists signed to the label, along with other guest artists.
Originally the album was to feature only Zion & Lennox, Plan B & Tony Dize. But due to disputes with Raphy Pina: Tony Dize left Pina Records to join DJ Memo's newly created label, and on February 6, 2012: Jalil Lopez was added to the roster, along with Arcángel who signed on February 27, 2012 and former WY Records artist Lobo who signed on July 3, 2012.

Discography

Studio albums 
 La Fórmula (August 21, 2012)

Singles 
 "Me Prefieres A Mi" by Arcángel (May 22, 2012)
 "Cuando Te Enamores" by RKM & Ken-Y (June 12, 2012)
 "Chupop" by Zion & Lennox (June 12, 2012)
 "3 Pa' 3" by RKM, Maldy & Lennox (June 12, 2012)
 "Princesa Mia" by Jalil Lopez (June 12, 2012)

Music videos 
 "Princesa Mia" (March 20, 2012)
 "Me Prefieres A Mi" (May 1, 2012)

Reggaeton groups